In Greek mythology, Melaneus (/ˈmɛlənˌjuːs/; Ancient Greek: Μελανεύς) may refer to the following personages:

 Melaneus, son of Apollo and husband of Oechalia.
 Melaneus, counted among the Ethiopian chiefs and was in the court of Cepheus at the time of the fight between Perseus and Phineus, and was killed during the same fight.
Melaneus, an Indian, whose shape Hera took to warn Astraeis, and Indian captain during Dionysus' Indian War.
Melaneus, joined, along with his father and brothers, Deriades against Dionysus in the Indian War. He was son of Aretus and Laobie and thus brother of Lycus, Myrsus, Glaucus and Periphas.
 Melaneus, a centaur mentioned by Ovid among many others who fought in the battle between the Lapiths and the centaurs.
Melaneus, father of Autonous, the father of Anthus, Erodius, Schoenous, Acanthus and Acanthis by Hippodamia.
 Melaneus, a Trojan warrior and brother of Alcidamas. He was killed by Neoptolemus, Achilles' son, during the Trojan War.
 Melaneus, father of Amphimedon, one of the suitors of Penelope.
 Melaneus, one of Actaeon's dogs.

Notes

References 

 Antoninus Liberalis, The Metamorphoses of Antoninus Liberalis translated by Francis Celoria (Routledge 1992). Online version at the Topos Text Project.
 Gaius Julius Hyginus, Fabulae from The Myths of Hyginus translated and edited by Mary Grant. University of Kansas Publications in Humanistic Studies. Online version at the Topos Text Project.
 Homer, The Odyssey with an English Translation by A.T. Murray, PH.D. in two volumes. Cambridge, MA., Harvard University Press; London, William Heinemann, Ltd. 1919. . Online version at the Perseus Digital Library. Greek text available from the same website.
 Nonnus of Panopolis, Dionysiaca translated by William Henry Denham Rouse (1863-1950), from the Loeb Classical Library, Cambridge, MA, Harvard University Press, 1940.  Online version at the Topos Text Project.
 Nonnus of Panopolis, Dionysiaca. 3 Vols. W.H.D. Rouse. Cambridge, MA., Harvard University Press; London, William Heinemann, Ltd. 1940–1942. Greek text available at the Perseus Digital Library.
 Publius Ovidius Naso, Metamorphoses translated by Brookes More (1859-1942). Boston, Cornhill Publishing Co. 1922. Online version at the Perseus Digital Library.
 Publius Ovidius Naso, Metamorphoses. Hugo Magnus. Gotha (Germany). Friedr. Andr. Perthes. 1892. Latin text available at the Perseus Digital Library.
 Quintus Smyrnaeus, The Fall of Troy translated by Way. A. S. Loeb Classical Library Volume 19. London: William Heinemann, 1913. Online version at theio.com
 Quintus Smyrnaeus, The Fall of Troy. Arthur S. Way. London: William Heinemann; New York: G.P. Putnam's Sons. 1913. Greek text available at the Perseus Digital Library.

Centaurs
Trojans
Dionysus in mythology